Eric Verpaele (Zelzate, 2 February 1952 – Ertvelde, 10 August 2015) pseudonym Eriek Verpale was a Belgian writer. He attended a boarding school in Oostakker and studied Germanic and Slavic philology at the University of Ghent. He was an editor of the magazine Koebel, several literary magazines and the Belgisch-Israëlitisch Weekblad (E: Belgian-Israeli Weekly).

He made his literary debut as a poet with neoromantic poems in Polder- en andere gedichten (1975). His maternal great-grandmother was of jiddisch Polish-Jewish ancestry, and the chasidic and Eastern European literature play an important role in his work.

Bibliography
 De rabbi en andere verhalen (1975)
 Polder- en andere gedichten (1975)
 Voor een simpel ogenblik maar ... (1976)
 Een meisje uit Odessa (1979)
 Op de trappen van Algiers (1980)
 Alles in het klein (1990)
 Onder vier ogen (1992)
 Olivetti 82 (1993)
 Nachten van Beiroet (1994)
 De patatten zijn geschild (1995)
 Grasland (1996)
 Gitta (1997)
 Katse nachten (2000)

See also
 Flemish literature
 Bernard, a feature film made of the monologue "Olivetti" 82 can be freely watched online.

Sources

 Eriek Verpale
 Eriek Verpale

External links

1952 births
2015 deaths
Belgian people of Polish-Jewish descent
Flemish poets
20th-century Belgian poets
People from Zelzate